Oscar Brashear (born August 18, 1944) is an American jazz trumpeter and session musician from Chicago, Illinois.

After studying at DuSable High School and Wright Jr. College (currently known as Wilbur Wright College) under John DeRoule he worked briefly with Woody Herman before going on to join Count Basie '68-9, returning to freelance in Chicago with Sonny Stitt, Gene Ammons, Dexter Gordon and James Moody. Moving to Los Angeles in 1971, he worked with Gerald Wilson, Harold Land, Oliver Nelson, Shelly Manne, Quincy Jones (with whom he toured in Japan), Horace Silver and Duke Pearson.

Brashear has recorded with Teddy Edwards, Jimmy Smith, Sonny Rollins, Benny Golson, Bobby Hutcherson, B. B. King, Bobby Bland, Freddie Hubbard, Joe Farrell, The Crusaders, McCoy Tyner, Gene Harris, Randy Newman, Frank Sinatra, Earth, Wind & Fire, Carole King, Benny Carter, Billy Higgins and Ry Cooder.

Discography
With Nat Adderley
Double Exposure (Prestige, 1975)
With Count Basie
Manufacturers of Soul (Brunswick, 1968) with Jackie Wilson
The Board of Directors Annual Report (Dot, 1968) with The Mills Brothers
Basie Straight Ahead (Dot, 1968)
How About This (Paramount, 1968) with Kay Starr
Standing Ovation (Dot, 1969)
Basic Basie (MPS, 1969)
The Dedication Series, Vol. XI: Retrospective Sessions (Impulse!, 1969)
With Regina Belle
Lazy Afternoon (Peak, 2004)
With Bobby Bland and B. B. King
Bobby Bland and B. B. King Together Again...Live (MCA, 1976)
With Brass Fever
Brass Fever (Impulse!, 1975) 
Time Is Running Out (Impulse!, 1976)
With Kenny Burrell
Both Feet on the Ground (Fantasy, 1973)
Heritage (AudioSource, 1980)
With Donald Byrd
Caricatures (Blue Note, 1976) 
With Ry Cooder
Paradise and Lunch (Reprise, 1974)
Chicken Skin Music (Reprise, 1976)
Jazz (Reprise, 1978) 
With The Crusaders
Street Life (MCA, 1979)
With Miles Davis
Dingo (Warner Bros., 1991)
With Neil Diamond
Up on the Roof: Songs from the Brill Building (Columbia, 1993)
With Earth, Wind & Fire
The Need of Love (Warner Bros, 1971)
Last Days and Time (Columbia, 1972)
Head to the Sky (Columbia, 1973)
Spirit (Columbia, 1976)All 'n All (Columbia, 1977)I Am (Columbia, 1979)Raise! (Columbia, 1981)Powerlight (Columbia, 1983)Heritage (Columbia, 1990)
With Teddy EdwardsBlue Saxophone (Verve/Gitanes, 1992 [1993])
With Joe FarrellNight Dancing (Warner Bros., 1978)
With Henry FranklinThe Skipper at Home (Black Jazz Records, 1974)
With Dizzy GillespieFree Ride (Pablo, 1977) composed and arranged by Lalo Schifrin
With Benny Golson
 California Message (Baystate, 1981) with Curtis Fuller
With Eddie HarrisBad Luck Is All I Have (Atlantic, 1975)How Can You Live Like That? (Atlantic, 1976)
With Gene HarrisAstral Signal (Blue Note, 1975)
With Donny HathawayEverything Is Everything (Atco, 1970)
With Hampton HawesUniverse (Prestige, 1972)Blues for Walls (Prestige, 1973)
with Joe HendersonCanyon Lady (Milestone, 1973 [1975])Black Miracle (Milestone, 1976)
With Billy HigginsBilly Higgins Quintet (Sweet Basil, 1993)
With Richard "Groove" HolmesSix Million Dollar Man (RCA/Flying Dutchman, 1975)
With Paul HornDream Machine (Mushroom Records, 1978)
With Freddie HubbardThe Love Connection (Columbia, 1979)
With Bobby HutchersonHead On (Blue Note, 1971) Inner Glow (Blue Note, 1975) Montara (Blue Note, 1975)Farewell Keystone (Theresa, 1982 [1988])
With Bobbi HumphreyFancy Dancer (Blue Note, 1975) 
With Paul Humphrey SextetPaul Humphrey Sextet featuring Oscar Brashear (Discovery Records, 1981)
With Ahmad JamalNight Song (Motown, 1980)
With Rick JamesBustin' Out of L Seven (Gordy, 1979)
With J. J. JohnsonPinnacles (Milestone, 1980)
With KarmaCelebration (Horizon/A&M, 1976)For Everybody (Horizon/A&M, 1977)
With Carole KingSimple Things (Capitol, 1977)Welcome Home (Capitol, 1978)
With Harold LandDamisi (Mainstream, 1972)Xocia's Dance (Muse, 1981)
With Hubert LawsThe San Francisco Concert (CTI, 1975)
With Ray ManzarekThe Golden Scarab (Mercury, 1974)
With Carmen McRaeCan't Hide Love (Blue Note, 1976)
With Blue MitchellStratosonic Nuances (RCA, 1975)
With Oliver NelsonSkull Session (Flying Dutchman, 1975)
With Willie NelsonHealing Hands of Time (Capitol, 1994)
With Randy NewmanBad Love (DreamWorks, 1999)
With Bonnie RaittTakin' My Time (Warner Bros., 1973)
With Sonny RollinsThe Way I Feel (Milestone, 1976)
With Patrice RushenPrelusion (Prestige, 1974)Before the Dawn (Prestige, 1975)
With Joe SampleDid You Feel That? (Warner Records, 1994) 
With Moacir SantosMaestro (Blue Note, 1973) Carnival of the Spirits (Blue Note 1975) 
With Lalo SchifrinGypsies (Tabu, 1978) 
With Zoot SimsHawthorne Nights (Pablo, 1977)Passion Flower: Zoot Sims Plays Duke Ellington (Pablo Today, 1980) with the Benny Carter Orchestra 
With Horace SilverSilver 'n Brass (Blue Note, 1975)It's Got to Be Funky (Columbia, 1993)Pencil Packin' Papa (Columbia, 1994)
With Frank SinatraL.A. Is My Lady (Qwest/Warner Bros. Records, 1984)
With Gábor SzabóFaces (Mercury, 1977)
With Stanley TurrentineEverybody Come On Out (Fantasy, 1976)
With McCoy Tyner13th House (Milestone, 1981)
With Was (Not Was)What Up, Dog? (Chrysalis, 1988)
With Gerald WilsonJessica (Trend, 1983)Calafia (Trend, 1985)Jenna (Discovery, 1989)Theme for Monterey (MAMA, 1998)
With Valerie CarterJust a Stone's Throw Away'' (Columbia, 1977)

References

1944 births
Living people
American jazz trumpeters
American male trumpeters
Count Basie Orchestra members
Musicians from Chicago
Swing trumpeters
Wilbur Wright College alumni
Jazz musicians from Illinois
American male jazz musicians
Clayton-Hamilton Jazz Orchestra members
The Tonight Show Band members
The Blackbyrds members
Karma (American band) members